The Communauté d'agglomération du Grand Guéret was created on December 15, 1992 as communauté de communes de Guéret Saint-Vaury and is located in the Creuse département of the Nouvelle-Aquitaine region, central France. In January 2013 it absorbed three more communes, and became a communauté d'agglomération. In 2018 it absorbed three communes from the Communauté de communes Creuse Sud Ouest. Its area is 480.6 km2. Its population was 28,527 in 2019, of which 12,734 in Guéret proper.

Composition
The communauté d'agglomération consists of the following 25 communes:

Ajain
Anzême
La Brionne
Bussière-Dunoise
La Chapelle-Taillefert
Gartempe
Glénic
Guéret
Jouillat
Mazeirat
Montaigut-le-Blanc
Peyrabout
Saint-Christophe
Sainte-Feyre 
Saint-Éloi
Saint-Fiel
Saint-Laurent
Saint-Léger-le-Guérétois
Saint-Silvain-Montaigut
Saint-Sulpice-le-Guérétois
Saint-Vaury
Saint-Victor-en-Marche
Saint-Yrieix-les-Bois
La Saunière
Savennes

See also
Communes of the Creuse department

References

Gueret
Gueret